Reed aerophones is one of the categories of musical instruments found in the Hornbostel-Sachs system of musical instrument classification. In order to produce sound with these Aerophones the player's breath is directed against a lamella or pair of lamellae which periodically interrupt the airflow and cause the air to be set in motion.

422 Reed aerophones

422.1 Double reed instruments - There are two lamellae which beat against one another.
422.11 (Single) oboes.
422.111 With cylindrical bore.

422.111.1 Without fingerholes.

422.111.2 With fingerholes.
Duduk
Piri

422.112 With conical bore.
Bassoon
Hne
Oboe
Cor anglais
Oboe d'amore
Shawm
Taepyeongso

422.12 Sets of oboes.
422.121 With cylindrical bore.
422.122 With conical bore.

422.2 	Single reed instruments - The pipe has a single 'reed' consisting of a percussion lamella.
422.21 (Single) clarinets.
422.211 With cylindrical bore.

422.211.1 Without fingerholes.

422.211.2 With fingerholes.
Albogue
Alboka
Arghul
Chalumeau
Clarinet
Piccolo (or sopranino, or octave) clarinet
Soprano clarinet (including E-flat clarinet)
Basset clarinet
Clarinette d'amour
Basset horn
Alto clarinet
Bass clarinet
Contra-alto clarinet
Contrabass clarinet
Octocontra-alto clarinet
Octocontrabass clarinet
Diplica
Hornpipe
Pibgorn
Saxonette
Sipsi
Xaphoon
Zhaleika

422.212 With conical bore.
422.21.1 Without fingerholes
Sneng (end-blown version)

422.21.2 With fingerholes
Heckel-clarina
Heckelphone-clarinet
Octavin
Saxophone
Soprillo
Sopranino saxophone
Soprano saxophone
Mezzo-soprano saxophone
Alto saxophone
Tenor saxophone
C melody saxophone
Baritone saxophone
Bass saxophone
Contrabass saxophone
Subcontrabass saxophone
Tubax
Sneng (side blown version)
Tárogató (after 1890)

422.22 Sets of clarinets.
Aulochrome
Double clarinet
Launeddas
Mijwiz

422.3 Reedpipes with free reeds - The reed vibrates through [at] a closely fitted frame. There must be fingerholes, otherwise the instrument belongs to the free reeds 412.13.

422.31 Single pipes with free reed.
Bawu

422.32 Double pipes with free reeds.
Hulusi

References
 Music.vt.edu
 Wesleyan.edu

 
Lists of musical instruments